Ronak Patel (born 18 August 1988) is a Ugandan cricketer. In July 2018, he was part of Uganda's squad in the Eastern sub region group for the 2018–19 ICC World Twenty20 Africa Qualifier tournament. In October 2018, he was named in Uganda's squad for the 2018 ICC World Cricket League Division Three tournament in Oman. He played in Uganda's opening fixture of the tournament, against Denmark on 9 November 2018.

In July 2019, he was one of twenty-five players named in the Ugandan training squad, ahead of the Cricket World Cup Challenge League fixtures in Oman. In November 2019, he was named in Uganda's squad for the Cricket World Cup Challenge League B tournament in Oman. He made his List A debut, for Uganda against Jersey, on 2 December 2019.

In April 2021, he was named in Uganda's Twenty20 International (T20I) squad for their series against Namibia. He made his T20I debut on 3 April 2021, for Uganda against Namibia. In November 2021, he was named in Uganda's squad for the Regional Final of the 2021 ICC Men's T20 World Cup Africa Qualifier tournament in Rwanda. In May 2022, he was named in Uganda's side for the 2022 Uganda Cricket World Cup Challenge League B tournament.

References

External links
 

1988 births
Living people
Ugandan cricketers
Uganda Twenty20 International cricketers
Place of birth missing (living people)